The Maid at the Palace (French: La petite bonne du palace) is a 1927 French silent film directed by Louis Mercanton and starring Betty Balfour, Lucy Sibley and Irene Tripod.

Cast
 Betty Balfour as Betty Cinders  
 Lucy Sibley as Mme Catchpole  
 Irene Tripod as Pensionnaire / Guest  
 Henriette Clairval-Terof as Gouvernante / Governess  
 André Roanne as Richard Dalroy  
 Fred Wright as Professeur Potrefax  
 Louis Baron fils as Signor Ferraro  
 Albert Decoeur as Le maître d'hôtel  
 Louis Mercanton as Chef  
 Jean Mercanton as Groom / Bellboy  
 Georges Bernier as Le plongeur / Dishwasher  
 Ernest Chambery as Valet  
 A.G. Poulton
 Julio de Romero

References

Bibliography
 John Holmstrom. The moving picture boy: an international encyclopaedia from 1895 to 1995. Michael Russell, 1996.

External links

1927 films
Films directed by Louis Mercanton
French silent feature films
Films set in London
Films set in France
French black-and-white films
Pathé films
1920s French films